Acrocnida brachiata, the sand burrowing brittlestar, is a species of brittle star in the family Amphiuridae. It occurs on the seabed in the northeastern Atlantic Ocean and the North Sea, living semi-buried in the sand with only its arm tips projecting.

Description
It is greyish-brown in colour. It can be distinguished from other similar species by the transverse furrows in the plates at the bases of the arms, the ventral scales bearing small tubercles and by the presence of an outer mouth papilla which is quite distinct from the paired papillae inside the mouth. The arms, which like other brittle stars flex sideways rather than up and down, have a pair of tentacle scales on each joint as well as numerous spines.

Distribution and habitat
A. brachiata occurs in the northeastern Atlantic Ocean and North Sea. It is a benthic species, living on sandy bottoms and burying itself in the sediment, with only the tips of its arms projecting. It often occurs in association with the burrowing sea urchin Echinocardium cordatum, commonly known as the sea potato.

Taxonomy
There is a marked difference in morphology between populations in the intertidal zone and those thought to be the same species living in the subtidal zone. Study of these differences led to the describing of a new species Acrocnida spatulispina by Sabine Stöhr and Delphine Muths in 2009, for the deeper water individuals. The brittle stars in the genus Acrocnida show morphological affinities with Amphiura chiajei, but less with Amphiura filiformis.

References

Amphiuridae
Animals described in 1804